The Popular Alliance (AP) was a liberal-centrist political party in San Marino.  The party formed a coalition with the Union for the Republic for the 2016 Sammarinese general election, and following their electoral success the two parties created a new party, Future Republic.

History
AP was born as an anti-establishment party in 1993, in parallel with the rise of Lega Nord in Italy, of which it has been long considered the Sanmarinese counterpart, but has since then become a stable political force in San Marino, participating in government coalitions with the centrist Sammarinese Christian Democratic Party (PDCS), as well as with the centre-left Party of Socialists and Democrats (PSD) since 2002.

In the 2006 Sammarinese general election the party won 12.1% of the vote and 7 out of 60 seats in the Grand and General Council, making it the third-largest party of the country. In 2008 after the breaking-up of the governing coalition, due to the rising clashes between AP and United Left, under the new electoral system, the party decided to join PDCS in the centrist Pact for San Marino coalition for the 2008 general election, gaining 11.5% of votes and 7 seats out of the 35 of the coalition gained and 11.52% of the national vote. Assunta Meloni became one of the two Joint Captains Regent of San Marino.

After the political crisis of 2011, AP confirmed its alliance with PDCS, creating the new alliance San Marino Common Good, which won the 2012 Sammarinese general election, even though AP itself lost three seats.

For the 2016 Sammarinese general election, AP broke its alliance with PDCS and formed the Future Republic electoral list with Union for the Republic, which was a part of the Adesso.sm coalition. The list won eleven seats in the election's second round run-off.

On 24 February 2017, AP and UpR officially merged and formed Future Republic as a political party.

See also
Liberalism by country
List of political parties in San Marino

References

External links
Official website

1993 establishments in San Marino
2017 disestablishments in San Marino
Centrist parties in Europe
Defunct liberal political parties
Defunct political parties in San Marino
Liberal parties in San Marino
Political parties disestablished in 2017
Political parties established in 1993